Laurie A. Cumbo (born February 4, 1975) is an American politician and Commissioner of the New York City Department of Cultural Affairs. A Democrat, she served in the New York City Council for the 35th district from 2014 to 2021, which includes the Brooklyn neighborhoods of Fort Greene, Clinton Hill, and Prospect Heights, portions of Bedford-Stuyvesant, Crown Heights, Downtown Brooklyn, the Brooklyn Navy Yard, and Vinegar Hill. She is the founder and first executive director of the Museum of Contemporary African Diaspora Arts.

Cumbo was ineligible to run in 2021 due to term limits.

Early life and education
Cumbo was born in Brooklyn, New York to Wilkins and Beverly Cumbo, the latter an opera singer, and raised in East Flatbush at a time when waves of people of Jewish descent were leaving and residents of African descent were arriving. (Her father had moved to the neighborhood in the 1940s.)

After graduating from Brooklyn Technical High School, she was accepted into and enrolled in Spelman College in Atlanta, Georgia in 1997, inspired by the actions of characters on The Cosby Show and A Different World. After receiving a degree in fine arts there, she received a master's degree in visual arts administration from New York University in 1999.

Early career
Based on her 1999 NYU graduate work and a trip to Bilbao, Spain, Cumbo founded and served as the executive director of the Museum of Contemporary African Diaspora Arts (MoCADA). She told the New York Times'''s Local, "prior to [receiving her master's] I would say I was very inspired by the Guggenheim Museum in Bilbao, Spain. This museum created a whole economy for this particular city after its shipping industry died. It made Bilbao and the museum a must destination when visiting Spain. I know that MoCADA can do that for Brooklyn as well."

Originally based in a building operated by the Bridge Street AME church in the Bedford-Stuyvesant section of Brooklyn, the institution moved to its current location in the borough's gentrified Fort Greene section within the BAM Cultural District with the help of the Brooklyn Academy of Music's Local Development Corporation, which included Bruce Ratner, the Barclays Center and Atlantic Yards developer, on its board.
In 2012, the museum landed a $100,000 grant from the Rockefeller Foundation to pay for a two-year program that brought monthly concerts to public spaces in nearby NYCHA Houses like Walt Whitman, Ingersoll, and Farragut in Fort Greene that drew crowds up to 500 or 600. The following year, MoCADA launched another art performance series, Soul of Brooklyn, "a borough-wide celebration of the diverse arts and cultures of Brooklyn's African Diaspora". From 2001 to 2011, Cumbo served as a graduate professor in the Arts and Cultural Management program at Pratt Institute's School of Art & Design.

Controversy before political tenure
In December 2013, one month before she was sworn in, a series of attacks took place targeting Jewish residents of Crown Heights, Brooklyn, totaling at least eight victims including children. The attacks were alleged to be part of a trend of "knockout attacks", and antisemitism was cited by a number of community leaders, politicians and media outlets as a precipitating factor. Following the attacks, Cumbo publicly expressed that her African American and Afro-Caribbean constituents had expressed fear of being "pushed out of their homes by Jewish landlords", and that resentment towards the Jewish residents of Crown Heights "offer possible insight as to how young African-American/Caribbean teens could conceivably commit a 'hate crime' against a community that they know very little about." She wrote "I admire the Jewish community immensely.... I respect and appreciate the Jewish community's family values and unity that has led to strong political, economic and cultural gains. While I personally regard this level of tenacity, I also recognize that for others, the accomplishments of the Jewish community triggers feelings of resentment, and a sense that Jewish success is not also their success." Her response was covered widely on blogs and in the New York press.

Cumbo's statements raised concerns among many residents, and in addition to other local media, the story was featured in local Jewish media outlets. Cumbo later apologized to her constituents for her remarks, saying in a statement, "I sincerely apologize to all of my constituents for any pain that I have caused by what I wrote ... and I understand now that my words did not convey what was in my heart, which is a profound desire to bring our diverse communities closer together." The next year she allocated thousands of dollars in district council money to a Crown Heights Orthodox Jewish community group.

Earlier, in April 2010, while head of MoCADA, she was quoted in the New York Times's Local with another remark regarding Jews. She said, "I'm trying to figure out new ways to do what I want to do to grow the museum.... You have a Jewish children's museum, but you don't feel that there should be a black-centered museum?"

New York City Council

2013 election
In 2013, she moved into the 35th Council district to run for its city council seat. By the end of August 2013, Cumbo's political campaign had received at least $80,000 from Jobs for New York PAC, a pro-development political action committee unpopular in an already rapidly gentrifying area. In an AARP-sponsored discussion a week later she claimed she received no money from the Real Estate Board of New York (backers of Jobs for New York), and that they had given no contributions to her campaign. She denied it again when confronted with the issue at a Brooklyn community board committee meeting in February 2015 even though she told the Brooklyn Paper at her 2013 victory party that she will be more developer-friendly than her predecessor and that "It would be almost malpractice to be a councilmember and to have no relationship with the developers who are building this community."

Elected in 2013 in a crowded Democratic primary race, Cumbo, unchallenged by a Republican candidate, succeeded Letitia James. She was handpicked to run by Brooklyn Congressman Hakeem Jeffries. Cumbo's political leanings are in some ways more conservative than that of her predecessor, and she has been the subject of further controversies. She had previously denounced the practice and encouraged voters to blow the whistle on excessive corporate support of political campaigns during her campaign. She did not appear at the public debate before the primary election for the council district seat on August 21, 2013. Despite this, she won the council seat on a platform, in part, of expanding and developing arts and cultural tourism in the district and making improved use of public spaces including parks. Her platform also included "Investing in Economic Development, Strengthening Not-for-Profits and Service Employees, Reforming Education." She was endorsed by Jeffries, New York State Assemblyman Walter Mosley, and the Working Families Party.

In May 2014 she was fined $7,868 by the New York City Campaign Finance Board for taking contributions above the limit from a group pushing for a ban on the horse-carriage industry.

2017 election
In 2017, Cumbo, now an incumbent, again defeated one of her 2013 opponents, Ede Fox, in the Democratic primary, 58% to 42%. She defeated then-Green Party candidate Jabari Brisport and Republican Christine Parker in the general election.

Cumbo is ineligible to run in 2021 due to term limits.

Tenure
Cumbo took office in January 2014. She was appointed chair of the Women's Issues Committee and serves on the following committees: Cultural Affairs, Libraries, and International Intergroup Relations; Finance; Higher Education; Public Housing; and Youth Services. She is a member of the Women's Caucus and the Black, Latino/a, and Asian Caucus. She is specifically passionate about women's issues such as domestic violence, workplace discrimination, girls education, and sex trafficking.

In her first six months in government, when city council members were working on the FY 2015 Budget, she and Council Member Ritchie Torres, chair of the Public Housing Committee, along with many residents advocated to stop 57 NYCHA community and senior centers from experiencing cuts in funding. As a result, the Council allocated $17 million to keep these centers open.

Early in October 2014, Cumbo, as chair of the Women's Issues Committee, and her colleague Vanessa Gibson, chair of the Public Safety Issues Committee, announced the council allocated nearly $6 million to support domestic violence programs and initiatives. On October 15, 2014, Cumbo joined by Speaker Melissa Mark-Viverito, Rosemonde Pierre-Louis, commissioner for the Mayor's Office to Combat Domestic Violence and other citywide elected officials, posted at subway stations across the city in a campaign that Cumbo organized in order to raise awareness of the problem of domestic violence in honor of "NYC Go Purple Visibility Day". She and her office partnered with the "Not on My Watch!" campaign back in June 2014.

She was also in strong support of hosting the 2016 Democratic National Convention in New York City, specifically Brooklyn, which failed. In arguing in favor of the convention coming to her borough, she argued "We have swag on lock down," continuing, "A convention anywhere else in the United States of America is just going to be 'eh.'"  This earned her an ingratiating visit from Senator Chuck Schumer at her first "state of the district" address at the Brooklyn Museum.

During Jumaane Williams's campaign for New York City Public Advocate, The Daily News broke the story of his 2009 arrest in a domestic dispute, the records that had been sealed, which were used by competing candidates. Cumbo, who went to high school with Williams, wrote a letter demanding to know if the law enforcement sources of the story broke city policy in doing so.

In 2021, Cumbo voted against allowing non-citizens to vote in municipal elections because she claimed it would dilute the power of black voters at the gain of Latino voters, implying Latino residents of the city were largely non-citizens.

Further controversies
Cumbo made local headlines again in late March 2015 when she asked why there were "blocs" (possibly "blocks") of Asians living in two Fort Greene housing projects. Colleague and Manhattan councilwoman Margaret Chin, who is Chinese-American, said "She certainly could've chosen her words a bit more carefully. The fact is that there are many Asian-American families . . . who have applied to live in public housing." Cumbo issued an apology, but then said she only wanted to know if the NYCHA "uses a cultural preference priority component" in picking tenants to which NYCHA chair Shola Olatoye replied that it did not, saying its vacancy rate is less than 1 percent, making such an influx almost impossible. The Brooklyn councilwoman then told the New York Post,'' "There could be some benefit to housing people by culture . . . I think it needs to be discussed." Queens Congresswoman Grace Meng, another Asian-American New York City representative, denounced Cumbo's idea, saying that it was "thinly disguised segregation based on race, color, creed or national origin." City council speaker Melissa Mark-Viverito while defending Cumbo called her comments "unfortunate."

In 2016, Cumbo was in favor of proceeding with the development of the Bedford Union Armory with BFC Partners via a lengthy public review process, despite community opposition, saying "Let's just continue to negotiate, see what the final outcome is, and if it's satisfactory," claiming adjustments could be made along the way. After many months of push back from residents and activist, she changed her position on May 18, 2017. The new plan passed six months later and still attracted protesters with Jonathan Westin of Communities for Change saying "The entire process was fixed from the beginning so the Mayor could push through a deal to one of his favored developers.... Plainly and simply: this is planned gentrification, driven by the gentrification mayor and rubber-stamped by Laurie Cumbo."

New York City Department of Cultural Affairs 
On March 18, 2022, Mayor Eric Adams appointed Cumbo as Commissioner of the New York City Department of Cultural Affairs.

References

External links
 Official 2013 campaign website

Living people
New York (state) Democrats
Place of birth missing (living people)
Politicians from Brooklyn
New York City Council members
Spelman College alumni
Steinhardt School of Culture, Education, and Human Development alumni
1975 births
Women New York City Council members
21st-century American politicians
21st-century American women politicians